The Hilbert basis of a convex cone C is a minimal set of integer vectors such that every integer vector in C is a conical combination of the vectors in the Hilbert basis with integer coefficients.

Definition 

Given a lattice   and a convex polyhedral cone with generators 

we consider the monoid . By Gordan's lemma this monoid is finitely generated, i.e., there exists a finite set of lattice points  such that every lattice point  is an integer conical combination of these points:

The cone C is called pointed, if  implies .

References 

 
 
 
 

Linear programming
Discrete geometry